Arbour Zena is an orchestral work composed by American jazz pianist Keith Jarrett featuring saxophonist Jan Garbarek, bassist Charlie Haden and members of the Stuttgart Radio Symphony Orchestra conducted by  which was recorded in October 1975 and released by ECM in 1976.

In the original notes of the compilation album "Keith Jarrett Selected Recordings", with music selected by Jarrett himself, he states that "I consider this one of my most richly lyrical and consistently inspired works. Of course, Jan Garbarek's contribution is irreplaceable and ecstatic. Go out and buy it."

Reception 
Reviewing the album for AllMusic, Richard S. Ginell awarded the album 3 stars and said, "although this music can be attractive in small doses, the lack of tempo or texture contrasts over long stretches of time – particularly the nearly 28-minute "Mirrors" –  can be annoying if you're not in the right blissful mood".

Reviewing the album for the website All About Jazz, John Kelman said, "Jarrett had already released music more aligned with the classical sphere on 1974's In the Light, which contained works for string quartet and brass quintet, a fughata for harpsichord and more; but it was with Arbour Zena—reuniting the pianist with the string section Stuttgart's Südfunk Symphony Orchestra and conductor Mladen Gutesha (who'd performed In the Lights "Metamorphosis")—that Jarrett found the magic nexus between composition and improvisation, both through his own contributions on piano and with the participation of Haden and saxophonist Jan Garbarek, also making the record an even broader marriage of his European and American concerns."

 Track listing 
All compositions by Keith Jarrett
 "Runes" (dedicated to the unknown) – 15:24
 "Solara March" (dedicated to Pablo Casals and the sun) – 9:48
 "Mirrors" (dedicated to my teachers) – 27:47

 Personnel 
 Keith Jarrett – piano
 Jan Garbarek – tenor and soprano saxophones
 Charlie Haden – bass
 Members of Stuttgart Radio Symphony Orchestra – conductor Production'
 Manfred Eicher – producer
 Martin Wieland – recording engineer
 Rolf Liese – cover graphic
 Dieter Bonhorst – layout

References 

Keith Jarrett albums
Jan Garbarek albums
1975 albums
ECM Records albums
Albums produced by Manfred Eicher